Betty Muthoni Gikonyo (born 27 May 1950) is a Kenyan medical entrepreneur, pediatric cardiologist and one of the country's best known healthcare professionals. She has been featured on CNN's African Voices and the BBC's Africa Business Report. Gikonyo is a Co-founder and the Chief Executive Officer at the Karen Hospital in Nairobi, Kenya.

Early life and education

Gikonyo was born on 27 May 1950 in the village of Kiamabara near Karatina town in Nyeri County. She came from a poor family and wore her first shoes at age 13.

She attended the Alliance Girls High School. Her first job was at the Kenya Railways and Harbours before she joined the university.

Her first major medical encounter was when her mother was diagnosed with cancer when Gikonyo was 14 years old. But her biggest inspiration to pursue a medical career came from her elder brother, Dr Wallace Kahugu, because her mother spoke highly of him. 

Gikonyo went on to acquire a Bachelor’s degrees in Medicine and Surgery from the University of Nairobi, a Master’s in pediatric cardiology from the same university and a post doctoral fellowship in pediatric cardiology from the University of Minnesota in the USA. In recent times and due to her role as a CEO, she has undertaken an MBA from Daystar University.

Karen Hospital and the Heart Runs

Together with her husband, Betty Gikonyo raised US$14 million to build the Karen Hospital. Of this, US$8 million came from Kenya Commercial Bank, a loan that the hospital has since repaid. The hospital was constructed between 2003 and March 2006. It had 450 employees as at 2015. The hospital also has satellite branches in Chester House (in Nairobi's city centre), Karatina, Meru, Nyeri, Nakuru, Kitengela and Mombasa. She plans to open a Betty Gikonyo School of Nursing in Ngong.

As part of her charity work, Gikonyo co-founded the Heart to Heart foundation, an organisation that raises funds for poor children suffering from heart ailments.
 In 1993, she (together with her husband) pioneered the Heart Runs, annual charity events today known as the Karen Hospital Heart Run (or the Heart to Heart Foundation Run) and the Mater Heart Run. The Mater Heart Run attracted an estimated 60,000 participants in 2015.

Personal life

She is married to Daniel Gikonyo, a cardiologist, Karen Hospital co-founder and the long-standing personal doctor of Kenya's third president Mwai Kibaki.

They met at the University of Nairobi during her second year and were married in June 1974. She is a mother of 3 grownup children (a cardiologist, an epidemiologist and a poet) and is a grandmother to eight. Her third child, a son, was born with a speech and hearing impediment that required multiple surgeries to correct. The surgeries proved successful and he now leads a normal life.

Awards
 Silver Star (SS) Presidential Award in 1998
 Moran of the Burning Spear (MBS) Presidential Award in 2008
 CEO Global Limited East Africa Regional Awards -  Most influential Woman (Medical category)

Membership
 Kenya Medical Association
 Kenya Cardiac Society
 Kenya Pediatric Association
 Kenya Medical Women Association.
 Chairperson of Nairobi Health Management Board 
 Chair of the University of Nairobi Alumni Association

References

External links
 The Karen Hospital
 Heart to Heart Foundation
 Mater Heart Run

Kenyan cardiologists
1950 births
Living people
Kenyan pediatricians
University of Nairobi alumni
University of Minnesota alumni
Alumni of Alliance Girls High School